Chorváty is a village and municipality in the Greater Košice District in the Košice Region of eastern Slovakia.

History 
Historically, the village was first mentioned in 1247. The name means "Croatian" most likley suggesting to the White Croats.

Geography 
The village lies at an elevation of 188 meters and covers an area of 3.30 km².
It has a population of about 95.

Genealogical resources

The records for genealogical research are available at the state archive "Statny Archiv in Kosice, Slovakia"

 Greek Catholic church records (births/marriages/deaths): 1760-1945 (parish A)

See also
 List of municipalities and towns in Slovakia

External links 
 
Surnames of living people in Chorvaty

Villages and municipalities in Košice-okolie District
1247 establishments in Europe
Croatian communities in Slovakia